2C-G is a psychedelic phenethylamine of the 2C family. First synthesized by Alexander Shulgin, it is sometimes used as an entheogen. It has structural and pharmacodynamic properties similar to 2C-D and Ganesha. Like many of the phenethylamines in PiHKAL, 2C-G and its homologs have only been taken by Shulgin and a small test group, making it difficult to ensure completeness when describing effects.

Chemistry 
2C-G is 3,4-dimethyl-2,5-dimethoxyphenethylamine, with the formula .

Dosage and effects
In Shulgin's book PiHKAL, the dosage range is listed as 20 to 35 mg. Effects are similar to the related Ganesha, and are extremely long lasting; the duration is 18–30 hours. Visual effects are muted or absent, and it is described in PiHKAL as an "insight-enhancer". Unlike other members of the 2C family, 2C-G is nearly as potent as its amphetamine cousin.

Homologs 
Several homologs of 2C-G were also synthesized by Shulgin. These include 2C-G-3, 2C-G-5, and 2C-G-N. Some, such as 2C-G-1, 2C-G-2, 2C-G-4, and 2C-G-6 are possible to synthesize in principle but impossible or extraordinarily difficult to do so in practice.

Legal status

Canada
As of October 31, 2016; 2C-G is a controlled substance (Schedule III) in Canada.

United Kingdom
2C-G and all other compounds featuring in PiHKAL are Class A drugs in the United Kingdom.

United States

In the United States 2C-G is considered a Schedule 1 controlled substance as a positional isomer of 2C-E and 2,5-Dimethoxy-4-methylamphetamine (DOM).

See also
 Phenethylamine
 Ganesha

References

External links
2C-G Entry in PiHKAL • info
2C-G-3 Entry in PiHKAL • info
2C-G-4 Entry in PiHKAL • info
2C-G-5 Entry in PiHKAL • info
2C-G-N Entry in PiHKAL • info

2C (psychedelics)
Designer drugs